The 94th Flying Training Squadron is part of the 306th Flying Training Group based at United States Air Force Academy, Colorado.  It conducts glider training for Air Force Academy cadets. The 94 FTS conducts thousands of sorties every year at the world's busiest VFR airfield. It is the parent squadron of the Air Force Academy's advanced soaring teams: the Aerobatic Demonstration Team and the elite Sailplane Racing Team. The squadron is augmented by the reserve 70th Flying Training Squadron.

History

World War II

Activated in June 1943 under I Troop Carrier Command and equipped with Douglas C-47 Skytrains.   Trained in various parts of the eastern United States until the end of 1943.  Deployed to England and assigned to IX Troop Carrier Command.

Prepared for the invasion of Nazi-occupied Europe. Began operations by dropping paratroops of the 101st Airborne Division in Normandy on D-Day (6 June 1944) and releasing gliders with reinforcements on the following day. The unit received a Distinguished Unit Citation and a French citation for these missions.  After the Normandy invasion the squadron ferried supplies in the United Kingdom.

After moving to France in September, the unit dropped paratroops of the 82nd Airborne Division near Nijmegen and towed gliders carrying reinforcements during the airborne attack on the Netherlands. In December, it participated in the Battle of the Bulge by releasing gliders with supplies for the 101st Airborne Division near Bastogne.

When the Allies made the air assault across the Rhine River in March 1945, each aircraft towed two gliders with troops of the 17th Airborne Division and released them near Wesel. The squadron also hauled food, clothing, medicine, gasoline, ordnance equipment, and other supplies to the front lines and evacuated patients to rear zone hospitals. It converted from C-47s to Curtiss C-46 Commandos and the new aircraft to transport displaced persons from Germany to France and Belgium after V-E Day.

Returned to the U.S. during the period July–September 1945, and trained with C-46 aircraft until inactivated.

Reserve operations
The squadron was activated in the reserves in 1949.  It was mobilized in 1951, but immediately inactivated and its personnel used as fillers for other units.

Airmanship training
The squadron has taught soaring to cadets at the United States Air Force Academy since October 1983.

Campaigns and decorations
 Campaigns: Rome-Arno, Normandy; Northern France; Southern France; Rhineland; Ardennes-Alsace; Central Europe.
 Decorations: Distinguished Unit Citation. France, [6-7] Jun 1944. French Croix de Guerre with Palm. [6-7] Jun 1944; 15 Aug 1944. French Fourragere.

Lineage
 Constituted as the 94th Troop Carrier Squadron on 14 May 1943
 Activated on 1 June 1943
 Inactivated on 31 July 1946
 Redesignated 94th Troop Carrier Squadron, Medium on 19 May 1949
 Activated in the reserve on 27 June 1949
 Ordered to active service on 1 April 1951
 Inactivated on 3 April 1951
 Redesignated 94th Airmanship Training Squadron on 30 September 1983
 Activated on 1 October 1983
 Redesignated 94th Flying Training Squadron on 31 October 1994

Assignments
 439th Troop Carrier Group, 1 June 1943
 Third Air Force, 10 June–31 July 1946
 439th Troop Carrier Group, 27 June 1949 – 3 April 1951
 United States Air Force Academy, 1 October 1983
 34th Operations Group, 31 October 1994
 306th Flying Training Group, 4 Oct 2004 – present

Stations

 Alliance Army Air Field, Nebraska, 1 June 1943
 Sedalia Army Air Field, Missouri, 15 June 1943
 Alliance Army Air Field, Nebraska, 2 August 1943
 Laurinburg-Maxton Army Air Base, North Carolina, 16 December 1943
 Baer Field, Indiana, 2–14 February 1944
 RAF Balderton (AAF-482), England, 10 March 1944
 RAF Upottery (AAF-462), England, 26 April 1944

 Juvincourt Airfield (A-68), France, 8 September 1944
 Lonray Airfield (A-45), France, 28 September 1944
 Chateaudun Airfield (A-39), France, 4 November 1944 – 7 September 1945
 Baer Field, Indiana, 22 September 1945
 Sedalia Army Air Field, Missouri, 7 October 1945 – 10 June 1946
 Selfridge Air Force Base, Michigan, 27 June 1949 – 3 April 1951
 USAF Academy, Colorado, 1 Oct 1983 – present

Aircraft

 Douglas C-47 Skytrain (1943–1945)
 Curtiss C-46 Commando (1945–1946)
 North American T-6 Texan (1949–1950)
 Beechcraft T-7 Navigator (1949–1951)
 Beechcraft T-11 Kansan (1949–1951)
 Curtiss TC-46 Commando (1949–1951)
 de Havilland Canada UV-18 Twin Otter (1983 - 1994)
 LET TG-10B Blanik (2002–2012)
 LET TG-10C Blanik (2002-2011)
 Schempp-Hirth TG-15A Duo Discus (2008–present)
 Schempp-Hirth TG-15B Discus 2 (2008–present)
 DG Flugzeugbau TG-16A (2011–present)

See also

References
 Notes

 Citations

Bibliography

 
 
 
 

Military units and formations in Colorado
United States Air Force Academy
0094